The year 2011 is the 10th year in the history of the Universal Reality Combat Championship, a mixed martial arts promotion based in the Philippines. In 2011 the URCC held 9 events beginning with, URCC Cebu 6: Respect.

Events list

URCC Cebu 6: Respect

URCC Cebu 6: Respect was an event held on January 14, 2011 at The Cebu International Convention Center in Cebu City, Philippines.

Results

URCC Baguio 3: Invasion

URCC Baguio 3: Invasion was an event held on February 19, 2011 at The Baguio Convention Center in Baguio, Philippines.

Results

URCC 19: Collision

URCC 19: Collision was an event held on April 2, 2011 at The World Trade Center in Pasay, Metro Manila, Philippines.

Results

URCC: Davao Digmaan 3

URCC: Davao Digmaan 3 was an event held on August 21, 2011 at The Garden Oases Resort & Convention Center in Davao City, Philippines.

Results

URCC: Tribal Gear: Dutdutan Tattoo Festival 2011

URCC: Tribal Gear: Dutdutan Tattoo Festival 2011 was an event held on August 26, 2011 at The World Trade Center in Pasay, Metro Manila, Philippines.

Results

URCC: University Challenge 2011

URCC: University Challenge 2011 was an event held on September 9, 2011 at The One Esplanade in Pasay, Metro Manila, Philippines.

URCC: Bacolod Brawl 2011

URCC: Bacolod Brawl 2011 was an event held on October 16, 2011 at The L'Fisher Hotel in Bacolod, Negros Occidental, Philippines.

Results

URCC 20: XX

URCC 20: XX was an event held on November 5, 2011 at The World Trade Center in Pasay, Metro Manila, Philippines.

Results

URCC: Rogue Magazine's Black Tie Brawl 2011

URCC: Rogue Magazine's Black Tie Brawl 2011 was an event held on November 19, 2011 at The New World Hotel in Makati, Metro Manila, Philippines.

Results

References

Universal Reality Combat Championship events
2011 in mixed martial arts